Cloyne is a small village in the township of Addington Highlands, Lennox and Addington County, Ontario, Canada.

The village offers a number of services for residents, snowmobilers, cottagers and campers, particularly those visiting Bon Echo Provincial Park to the north on Highway 41. There are also number of small shops, providing townspeople and visitors access to groceries, antiques, chainsaw carvings, hardware supplies, gas, and hunting and fishing gear. Cloyne is also home to the North Addington Education Centre and a Pioneer Museum. The northern end of the village features an oversized wooden white lawnchair, which is able to comfortably seat well over a dozen tourists for photograph opportunities.

References

External links
 

Communities in Lennox and Addington County